Pershing is an unincorporated community in northern Rochester Township, Fulton County, Indiana, United States. It lies along County Road 400W, northwest of the city of Rochester, the county seat of Fulton County.  Its elevation is 751 feet (229 m), and it is located at  (41.0961532, -86.3188916).

History
Pershing was originally called Germany, Indiana until anti-German sentiment in the First World War caused the new name of Pershing to be adopted. The post office was established as Germany in 1886, and remained in operation until it was discontinued in 1905.

The historic Germany Bridge was listed on the National Register of Historic Places in Fulton County, Indiana until some time after it was replaced with a new span in 1980.

References

Unincorporated communities in Fulton County, Indiana
Unincorporated communities in Indiana